Alix Schoelcher Idrache is a Haiti-born United States Army helicopter pilot.

Personal life
Idrache's father Dieujuste dropped out of school at 14 years old to find work in Port-au-Prince.  Alix Schoelcher Idrache was born in Haiti, devoted himself to schoolwork at his father's encouragement, and also saw the United States Armed Forces engaging in humanitarian missions there.  After Dieujuste emigrated to the United States, he was able to bring his son in 2009, who later became a naturalized citizen.  In May 2016, the US Army listed New Carrollton, Maryland as Idrache's hometown.

After he graduated from the United States Military Academy (USMA) in 2016, an Army photo of a tearful Idrache went viral, and made the freshly-minted officer the target of hateful comments related to his immigrant and naturalized status.

US Military
Idrache joined the Maryland Army National Guard in 2010—later joking that they convinced him "because of a free t-shirt!"  After completing Basic and Advanced Individual Training, Idrache successfully applied to the USMA with the assistance of his platoon leader and "the unit's full-time office administrator".  Arriving in 2012, Idrache graduated from the West Point, New York school (the Maryland Guard's first, at the top his class in physics) on 21 May 2016.  Second Lieutenant Idrache was scheduled to be assigned to the Army Aviation Center of Excellence at Fort Rucker in July 2016.

By June 2019, Idrache's uniform bore the insignia of a first lieutenant and the Army's 1st Infantry Division.  That month he was stationed in Carentan and liaising with French media on the occasion of the Normandy landings' 75th anniversary.  A captain assigned to the 228th Aviation Regiment by September 2021, Idrache joined Joint Task Force Haiti's response to the 2021 Haiti earthquake; the UH-60 Black Hawk pilot supported evacuation efforts as well as translating both French and Haitian Creole.

References

External links
 

Haitian emigrants to the United States
living people
Maryland National Guard personnel
National Guard (United States) officers
naturalized citizens of the United States
people from Prince George's County, Maryland
United States Army aviators
United States Army officers
United States Military Academy alumni
year of birth missing (living people)